Dick Helling (22 September 1950 – 30 December 2018) was a Dutch professional footballer who played as a midfielder.

Early and personal life
Helling was born in Zaandam into a middle-class family; he was the middle child of three.

Career
Helling began his career with ZFC, moving to Telstar in August 1971. He played for them until 1975. He next played for Ajax. Whilst at Ajax in 1975 he famously missed a penalty in a European Cup match against Levski-Spartak, resulting in Ajax's elimination from the competition. He made 29 appearances for Ajax – 21 in the league, 3 in the Cup, and 5 times in Europe. He returned to Telstar for a loan spell in 1976. He then spent 8 seasons with Volendam, for whom he scored 48 goals in 218 games in all competitions.  At Volendam he was part of the team which won promotion in May 1983. He ended his career with amateur side Always Forward.

Later life and death
He died on 30 December 2018, aged 68, in a hospice in Krommenie.

References

1950 births
2018 deaths
Dutch footballers
SC Telstar players
AFC Ajax players
FC Volendam players
Eredivisie players
Eerste Divisie players
Association football midfielders
Footballers from Zaanstad